The Trnovo District, or simply Trnovo, is a district of the City Municipality of Ljubljana, the capital of Slovenia.

External links

Trnovo District on Geopedia

 
Districts of Ljubljana